In automotive usage, a lead sled is a standard production automobile with a body heavily modified in particular ways (see below); especially, though not exclusively, a 1949, 1950 or 1951 model year Ford 'Shoebox' or Mercury Eight car. In the name, "lead" (as in the heavy metal) refers to the use of lead as a bodyfiller in early days, and "sled" refers to the lowering of the vehicle, giving these vehicles the appearance that they were "slip sliding" down the highway.

Period auto body repair, by an auto body mechanic used to be achieved through a combination of re-shaping sheet metal using specialist hand tools and the application of molten lead to damaged body panels, fulfilling the role of more modern polyester fillers. 
 
The same techniques were also used in high end low volume car production (coachbuilding) and adopted for aftermarket hot rodding body panel modifications.

Given that lead is toxic, the effective management of health hazards arising from autobody work with this material must include the exposure realms of fumes and dusts.

Automotive usage

In order to be classified as a “lead sled”, the vehicle was subjected to most, if not all, of the following body style modifications:

Chopped: cutting off the roof, shortening the pillars, and re-welding the roof back onto the car body
Channeled:  cutting the underside of the body to lower the entire body on the frame
Sectioned:  cutting a horizontal piece cut out of the body lengthwise, to reduce the beltline height
Frenched:  recessing headlights, tail lights, license plates, and radio antennae into the body for an exotic look.
Emblem removal: all original manufacturer's emblems were removed as these were considered to detract from the vehicle. The thought was "anything that produces a hiccup, a bulge or extrudes from the body is not aerodynamic and detracts from the smooth appearance of the vehicle." The object of the builder is to make the body as smooth, sleek, and sexy as possible.
 commonly referred to as “nosed” for the hood and “decked” for the trunk.
Dechromed:  all factory trim was removed as these dressings detracted from the lines of the car.
Drip rail removal:  rain drip rails were removed from the roof as they detracted from the smoothness of the vehicle.
Shaved:  door handles and locks were removed, because they detracted from the smoothness of the vehicle. Electric solenoids and switches were installed in inconspicuous places, typically under the rocker panels or side mirrors, to provide alternate means for opening the doors.

The entire process of removing badges, trim, and doorhandles was referred to as "shaving".

Grill modifications: the original grill was heavily modified, or substituted with the grill from a completely different make, model, and year car.

In the late 1940s and 1950s, plastic body filler and fiberglass did not exist. Instead, bar lead was used as a body filler. A true craftsman pulled and pushed out dents with body spoons, hammers and dollies until the sheet metal was as straight as they could get it. Any sheet metal that was still slightly wavy, the bodyman heated bars of lead and flowed the lead onto the body with an oxygen-acetylene torch similar to work done by a tin smith. The bars of lead were what we today call “solder” but were not the wire material we are familiar with today, typically sold for electrical or plumbing repairs. The lead bars or strips ranged anywhere from a quarter of an inch to one inch in width and several inches in length.

Lead craftsman call the process of melting the lead “running lead” and this is a highly specialized ancient trade passed from a master craftsman to an apprentice. An apprentice bodyman typically would remove the body part from the car and place it on a bench so as to have a fairly flat surface to flow the lead horizontally onto the body. In contrast, the master craftsman could control the heat of the lead in a vertical position without having to remove the body part, thereby saving time in performing the repair.

An apprentice bodyman most likely would have to grind and hand file the lead to a smooth finish for repainting. The master craftsman on the other hand did not have to grind and only had to hand file, if he had to perform any smoothing at all. The true craftsman controlled the flow of lead with his torch and most times could produce a satin finish without filing.

As time progressed, plastics such as "Bondo" were introduced to the market. These plastic body fillers are easier to work with and eventually replaced the use of lead in body repair.

Some common late model lead sleds are the 1949 Mercury, 50 Plymouth, 1949 Ford, and the 1959 Cadillac. These late model lead sleds and a play-on-words were the inspiration for the name of renowned custom car builder Bo Huff's Dead Sleds car club.

Other usages

Among aircraft nicknames, "lead sled" has also been used as a nickname for a variety of US military aircraft, including the F-4 Phantom, F3H Demon, F-84 Thunderjet, F-105 Thunderchief, and SR-71 Blackbird. In particular these airplanes tend to be large, heavy or very fast. Despite this, the airplane's maneuverability is relatively poor. The F-105 gained this nickname during the Vietnam War. While the plane was fast in straight lines it was not very maneuverable, rendering it very vulnerable to enemy weapons.

See also
Custom car
Lowrider
Hot rod

References

The Auto Channel - Car Speak-To-English Glossary of Terms

Lead
Modified vehicles
Kustom Kulture
Automotive styling features
Visual arts media